Josef Heumann (born October 14, 1964) was a West German-German ski jumper who competed from 1981 to 1992. He finished sixth in the team large hill event at the 1988 Winter Olympics in Calgary.

Heumann finished 23rd in the individual large hill event at the 1989 FIS Nordic World Ski Championships in Lahti. He finished 18th in the 1990 Ski-flying World Championships in Vikersund.

Heumann's best individual world Cup career finish was second in a normal hill event in West Germany in 1989.

References

External links

Josef Heumann's profile at Sports Reference.com

1964 births
Living people
German male ski jumpers
Ski jumpers at the 1988 Winter Olympics
Olympic ski jumpers of West Germany